North Gates is a census-designated place (CDP) in the Town of Gates, in Monroe County, New York, United States. The population was 9,512 at the 2010 census. The census area was part of Gates-North Gates CDP from 1980 thru 2000.

Geography 
Gates-North Gates was located at  (43.1715060, -77.7068534).

Demographics 

As of the census of 2010, there were 9,512 people, 4,214 households, and 2,460 families residing in the CDP.  The population density was 3,573.3 per square mile.  There were 4,467 housing units at an average density of 1,654.4/sq mi.  The racial makeup of the CDP was 80.8% White, 10.3% African American, 0.3% Native American, 4.4% Asian, 0.0% Pacific Islander and 2.6% from two or more races. Hispanic or Latino of any race were 6.6% of the population.

References

Census-designated places in New York (state)
Hamlets in New York (state)
Hamlets in Monroe County, New York